Now and Then is the 35th novel in Robert B. Parker's  Spenser series and first published in 2007.

When a simple case turns into a treacherous and politically charged investigation, Spenser faces his most difficult challenge yet-keeping his cool while his beloved Susan Silverman is in danger.

Spenser knows something's amiss the moment Dennis Doherty walks into his office. The guy's aggressive yet wary, in the way men frightened for their marriages always are. So when Doherty asks Spenser to investigate his wife Jordan's abnormal behavior, Spenser agrees.

References

2007 American novels
American detective novels
Spenser (novel series)
G. P. Putnam's Sons books